Rozendaal may refer to:

Rozendaal, a town in Gelderland, Netherlands
Rozendaal, South Holland, a town South Holland, the Netherlands
Rosendaël or Rozendaal, a former town in French Flanders, now a suburb of 
Rozendaal (surname), a Dutch surname

See also
Rosendaal
Rosendahl (disambiguation)
Rosendale (disambiguation)
Rosendal (disambiguation)
Rozendal, suburb of Stellenbosch, South Africa